Dmitro-Pokrovskoye is a rural locality (a selo) in Sukhogayovskoye Rural Settlement, Verkhnekhavsky District, Voronezh Oblast, Russia. The population was 56 as of 2010. There are 3 streets.

Geography 
Dmitro-Pokrovskoye is located 10 km southwest of Verkhnyaya Khava (the district's administrative centre) by road. Sukhiye Gai is the nearest rural locality.

References 

Rural localities in Verkhnekhavsky District